Willowmere, also known as Pearsall House, is a historic home located at Roslyn Harbor in Nassau County, New York.  It was originally constructed about 1750 as a -story, gambrel-roofed dwelling with a five-bay front facade.  It was expanded in 1893. It was the property of Admiral Aaron Ward (1851-1918), a rose lover. The portico was added in 1926, when the house was renovated to the Colonial Revival style.

It was added to the National Register of Historic Places in 1999.

References

Roslyn Harbor, New York
Houses on the National Register of Historic Places in New York (state)
Colonial Revival architecture in New York (state)
Houses completed in 1750
Houses in Nassau County, New York
National Register of Historic Places in Nassau County, New York